The Salinas is a river in Guatemala. The river is called Río Negro from its sources (located at ) in the highlands of Huehuetenango and El Quiché until it reaches the Chixoy hydroelectric dam (located at ), where the Río Salama and Rio Carchela converge with the Río Negro. After the Chixoy dam, the river is called Río Chixoy and flows northwards through Alta Verapaz until it reaches the border with Mexico.

Guatemala's National Institute for Electricity (INDE) is planning the construction of a new hydroelectric dam on the Chixoy river.

See also
 Río Negro Massacre

References

External links
Map of Guatemala including the river

Rivers of Guatemala
Rivers of Mexico
Guatemala–Mexico border
International rivers of North America
Geography of Mesoamerica
Geography of the Petén Department
Border rivers
Usumacinta River